Woodford is a large village and civil parish located in North Northamptonshire, England. At the time of the 2011 census, the parish's population (including Woodwell) was 1,461 people.

The village's name means 'wooded ford', referring to woodland near a shallow fording place on the River Nene.

It is in two distinct parts, the easterly, lower, part being alongside the River Nene and the westerly, upper, part is on the through road out of the Nene valley. Its parish church is dedicated to St Mary the Virgin and has the nickname "the Cathedral of the Nene".

Inside the church can be found a number of curiosities. Within a niche cut into a pillar, there is a mummified human heart wrapped in coarse cloth. This was discovered during restoration work in 1867. A framed newspaper cutting depicts a photograph of an alleged ghost taken in the church in 1964. A further display shows reproductions of photographs and newspapers from a time capsule concealed in the roof by the Reverend Smythe during the 1867 repair works, and rediscovered during further repairs in 1995. An unusual carving (particularly for places of Christian worship) can be found at the top of one of the pillars to the rear of the nave, depicting a Green Man, with vines growing out of the mouth. Finally, the combination of rounded and pointed arches in the nave indicate different periods of reconstruction in the Norman and Gothic styles respectively.

Woodford House, an early 19th-century mansion, was the home of the Arbuthnot family and scene of the death of the diarist Harriet Arbuthnot in 1833. The property was purchased in 1880 by Charles Henry Plevins from Arthur Arbuthnot, son of General Charles Arbuthnot. The house was altered between 1899 and 1910 and had a new garden created in 1909.  The Arbuthnots owned iron ore quarries on the estate which were dug from circa 1851, an early date for what was later to become a large industry in Northamptonshire. The Arbuthnot's quarry appears to have been short-lived but a sample of the ore was exhibited at the Great Exhibition in Hyde Park, London, in 1851. There was a further experiment in commercial quarrying from about 1860 and again in 1866. The early attempts suffered from a lack of transport facilities and the ore must have been taken away by horse and cart but in 1866 the Kettering to Thrapston railway opened and a connecting tramway was constructed from close to Woodford House to the railway at Twywell. The quarrying (and some adit mining) lasted from 1866 to 1886, starting near Woodford Lodge and extending north of the road later on. There were also quarries south west of Twywell Station on the north side of the road between 1881 and 1883. There was also a brickworks near there. The main tramway (standard gauge) had steam locomotives from the start but some of the quarries were connected to it by narrow gauge lines and these were worked by hand or by horse until 1883. There were some visible remains of the quarries and buildings at least until 1986.

Part of the ground north of the road near Woodford Lodge was reworked between 1914 and 1926 when quarries in Twywell Parish were extended. The ground here was landscaped and returned to cultivation in 1965.

These quarries were to the west of Woodford village. Another quarry to the north of the village operated from 1867 but was closed by 1892. This quarry was connected to a tipping dock on the railway east of Twywell Station by a horse operated 4 foot gauge tramway. No landscaping was undertaken until 1970 and there were still some traces of the quarry as at 1986

Heritage assets

The following buildings and structures are listed by Historic England as of special architectural or historic interest.

Three Hills Round Barrows (Scheduled) Bronze Age 
Bowl Barrow north of Woodford Mill (Scheduled) Bronze Age 
Remains of Manor House and Garden (Scheduled) Unknown date 
Medieval settlement remains (Scheduled) 9th century 
Church of St Mary (Grade I) from 12th century onwards 
Glebe Farmhouse (Grade I) 13th century 
Wall with Finial south of Church of St Mary (Grade II) 14th century 
Dovecote south of Manor Farmhouse (Grade II) 17th century 
Manor House Farmhouse (Grade II*) 17th century 
Woodford Rise (Grade II) 17th century with additions of the early 19th century and 1930s 
50, 52 and 54 High Street (Grade II) 17th century 
84 High Street (Grade II) 17th century 
Daventry Farmhouse and attached Outbuilding (Grade II) 17th century 
Cheyham Cottage (Grade II) 17th century 
Club Lane (Grade II) 18th century 
Woodford Mill (Grade II) 18th century 
82 and Part of Number 84 over Carriage Arch (Grade II) 18th century 
Woodford House, attached Cottages and Outbuildings (Grade II) 18th century 
Olde Ways (Grade II) 18th century 
Chest Tomb south of Church of St Mary (Grade II) 18th century 
The Rectory (Grade II) 19th century (1820) 
72 and 74 High Street (Grade II) 19th century 
The Round House and attached Barn (Grade II) 19th century 
70 High Street (Grade II) 19th century 
War Memorial at Church of St Mary (Grade II) 20th century 
War Memorial on The Green (Grade II) 20th century 

St Mary's Church was begun in the 12th century and has 13th,14th and 19th century features. The tower was complete by 1400.

The Manor House, although a 16th-century house has buttresses and a doorway of the 13th or early 14th century.

The Round House is dated 1815 and commemorates the Battle of Waterloo

Woodford House was enlarged between 1813 and 1826 and in 1902.

Demography

In 1801 there were 491 inhabitants
In 1831 there were 639 inhabitants
In 1841 there were 680 inhabitants
In 2011 there were 1,461 inhabitants

Notes

References
Northamptonshire County Council, Record office retrieved 9 May 2007.
The History of Ironstone Mining around Burton Latimer retrieved 9 May 2007

External links

Sargents FC Est 1994, a football team who play their home games in Woodford and are currently in Division One of the Rushden & District Sunday League.
Comprehensive village website

Villages in Northamptonshire
Civil parishes in Northamptonshire
North Northamptonshire